Michael Duncan may refer to:

 Michael Clarke Duncan (1957–2012), American actor
 Mike Duncan (born 1951), 60th Chairman of the Republican National Committee
 Mike Duncan (podcaster), American podcaster